Shore Leave is a 1962 Soviet drama film directed by Feliks Mironer.

Plot 
Sailor Nikolai Valezhnikov went south to the port city and spent there one day, for which he spoke with many people and met a woman with whom he fell in love and who fell in love with him.

Cast 
   Ariadna Shengelaya as Zhenya
 Lev Prygunov as Nikolai Valezhnikov
 Vasili Makarov as Vasily Kuzmich
 Svetlana Konovalova as Zinaida Prokofievna
 Vladimir Vysotsky as Pyotr
 Natalya Kustinskaya as Katya
 Gennadi Yukhtin as Vasily Ivanovich, former sailor
 Valentina Ananina as Nyura
 Viktor Sergachyov as student Vitya

References

External links 
 

1962 films
Films set in Crimea
1960s Russian-language films
Soviet teen drama films
Mosfilm films
1962 drama films
Russian teen drama films
Soviet black-and-white films
1960s teen drama films
Russian black-and-white films